Jaa can refer to the following:

Jaa (Newa cuisine) or jā, staple boiled rice of the Newars people in Nepal.
Jaa (Filipino cuisine) or lokot-lokot, a fried dough delicacy in the Filipino cuisine
Tony Jaa, Thai martial art film actor
Jaaa, song by artist "Die Fantastischen Vier" from their album "Vier gewinnt"
 Jaa, Punjabi song by Dakssh Ajit Singh 'n' Mannat Singh released by Tasbee Muzic

See also
 JAA (disambiguation), an abbreviation